Taung Pyinthe (lit. "Queen of the Southern Palace") was the chief queen consort of King Narathu of the Pagan Dynasty of Myanmar (Burma).

Her existence is inferred. None of the main chronicles has a record of the names of the queens of Narathu. The Yazawin Thit chronicle explicitly says no records of Narathu's queens could be found. Yazawin Thit and Hmannan Yazawin mention only that Naratheinkha and Sithu II had the same mother. Per Than Tun, their mother was the North Queen. It means there was a South Queen.

References

Bibliography
 

Chief queens consort of Pagan
12th-century Burmese women